The Olsen Gang's Last Trick is a 1998 Danish comedy film directed by Tom Hedegaard and Morten Arnfred, and starring Ove Sprogøe. The film was the 14th and last in the Olsen Gang-series.

Cast
 Ove Sprogøe as Egon Olsen
 Morten Grunwald as Benny Frandsen
 Poul Bundgaard as Kjeld Jensen
 Tommy Kenter as Kjeld Jensen (Stand-in)
 Kurt Ravn as the voice of Kjeld
 Grethe Sønck as Ruth Hansen
 Jes Holtsø as Børge Jensen
 Axel Strøbye as Kriminalassistent Jensen
 Ole Ernst as Politiassistent Holm
 Bjørn Watt-Boolsen as Hallandsen
 Henrik Koefoed as J.M.R. Holm Hansen Jr.
 Ove Verner Hansen as Bøffen
 Michael Hasselflug as Alf
 Jesper Langberg as Direktør for Statsadministrationens Destruktionsanstalt
 Claus Ryskjær as Portvagt
 Henrik Lykkegaard as Sikkerhedsvagt
 Benny Hansen as Portør
 Jan Hertz as Ejendomsmægler
 Holger Perfort as Forstander for Institut for Teoretisk kriminalitet

Reception
The movie is generally considered a disaster, both on and off screen. Main actor Poul Bundgaard and director Tom Hedegaard both died during production, Benny Hansen who appeared briefly as a hospital porter died two days after the end of filming, and veteran actor Bjørn Watt-Boolsen, who had appeared as the evil mastermind in most of the previous movies in the series, died just 10 days after opening night. The movie itself was generally scolded by critics, and even Olsen Gang creator and script writer Erik Balling later regretted having made it.

References

External links
 
 

1998 films
1990s Danish-language films
1998 comedy films
Olsen-banden films
1990s heist films
Danish comedy films
Films with screenplays by Erik Balling